Hargnies is a commune in the Nord department in northern France.

Climate 
In 2010, the commune's climate was classified as "semi-continental or mountain margin climate", according to the typology of climates in France, which at the time included eight major types of climate in mainland France. In 2020, the municipality was classified as having a "semi-continental climate" in the classification established by Météo-France, which now has only five main types of climate in mainland France. For this type of climate, the summers are hot and the winters harsh, with a large number of days of snow or frost. Annual rainfall is relatively high.

Heraldry

See also
Communes of the Nord department

References

Communes of Nord (French department)